Giovanni Battista Breda (21 July 1931 – 13 July 1992) was an Italian fencer. He won a silver medal in the team épée event at the 1964 Summer Olympics.

References

External links
 

1931 births
1992 deaths
People from Melegnano
Italian male fencers
Olympic fencers of Italy
Fencers at the 1960 Summer Olympics
Fencers at the 1964 Summer Olympics
Fencers at the 1968 Summer Olympics
Olympic silver medalists for Italy
Olympic medalists in fencing
Medalists at the 1964 Summer Olympics
Sportspeople from the Metropolitan City of Milan